Robert B. "Bobby" Drummond was an early twentieth-century Scottish association football inside forward who spent most of his career in the American Soccer League.

Career 
Drummond may have begun his career with Arbroath F.C. in his native Scotland. In 1923, he played a handful of games with the Fall River Marksmen at the end of the 1922–23 American Soccer League season. In September 1923, he moved to J&P Coats.

His best season came in 1924-25 when he scored eighteen goals in forty-two league games, putting him ninth on the league scoring table.  His production quickly tapered off.  During the 1925-26 season, he scored eleven goals (ten league and one cup) in thirty-two games (twenty-eight league and four cup games). This led to J&P Coats sending him to back to the Marksmen during the 1926-1927 season.

He played only two games in Fall River before moving to the Newark Skeeters for the end of the season. He began the 1927-28 season in Newark, but again moved, this time back to J&P Coats during the season.

In 1928, he joined the New Bedford Whalers where he played only four games over two seasons.

External links

References

American Soccer League (1921–1933) players
Fall River Marksmen players
J&P Coats players
Newark Skeeters players
New Bedford Whalers players
Scottish footballers
Scottish expatriate footballers
Association football forwards
Scottish expatriate sportspeople in the United States
Expatriate soccer players in the United States
Year of birth missing